Speedwell Cavern is one of the four show caves in Castleton, Derbyshire, England.

The cave system consists of a horizontal lead miners' adit (a level passageway driven horizontally into the hillside) 200 metres below ground leading to the cavern itself, a limestone cave. The narrow adit is permanently flooded, so after descending a long staircase, access to the cave is made by boat. At the end of the adit, the cavern opens up with fluorspar veins, stalactites and stalagmites, and the so-called "Bottomless Pit".

The mine was developed in the 1770s but the limited lead ore deposits meant that it was not profitable and it was closed down by 1790.

At the foot of Winnats Pass, it is a tourist attraction with an underground boat trip to the cavern. Originally the guide propelled the boat by pushing against the walls with his hands, later the boat was legged through, and now it is powered by an electric motor.

References 

Caves of Derbyshire
Tourist attractions in Derbyshire
Tourist attractions of the Peak District
Show caves in the United Kingdom
Limestone caves